Ulaş is a town in Çorlu district of the Tekirdağ Province, Turkey. It is situated in the Rumeli region of the Balkan peninsula (also known as Thrace in Turkey, the European part of Turkey) south of Turkish state highway , which connects İstanbul to Edirne and the Bulgarian border. As of 2011, the population was 5517.

Ulaş was founded in 1937 by Turkish refugees from Bulgaria. In 1992 it was declared the seat of its township. It is situated in a rapidly flourishing industrial area; there are about 60 factories or workshops in and around the town. Animal husbandry and agriculture are secondary economic sectors.

References

Populated places in Tekirdağ Province
Towns in Turkey
Çorlu District